Tülin Altıntaş (born 1982, in Balıkesir) is a Turkish volleyball player. Tülin is 187 cm and plays as middle player. She plays for DYO Karşıyaka and wears number 11. She also played for Güneş Sigorta, Vakıfbank, 75.Yıl, Yeşilyurt and Fenerbahçe Acıbadem.

See also
 Turkish women in sports

External links 
 Player profile at fenerbahce.org

1982 births
Living people
Sportspeople from Balıkesir
Turkish women's volleyball players
Fenerbahçe volleyballers
VakıfBank S.K. volleyballers
Yeşilyurt volleyballers
Karşıyaka volleyballers